Christian Stohr (born 17 June 1977) is a Swiss freestyle skier. He competed in the men's moguls event at the 2002 Winter Olympics.

References

1977 births
Living people
Swiss male freestyle skiers
Olympic freestyle skiers of Switzerland
Freestyle skiers at the 2002 Winter Olympics
People from Obwalden